Bo Eason (born March 10, 1961) is an American actor, playwright, author, motivational speaker, and retired football player who played safety for four seasons for the Houston Oilers.

Early life 
Eason was born and raised in Walnut Grove, California. His brother, Tony Eason, also played in the NFL. After graduating from Delta High School in Clarksburg, California, he played football for the Aggies at the University of California, Davis.

Career 
In 1986, Eason's season ended with a broken ankle in contest against the Miami Dolphins. He signed with the San Francisco 49ers in the 1988 offseason, but suffered a knee injury in training camp, ending his season and career.

In 2009, Eason partnered with Willoughby Productions to develop and create The Bo Eason Show, a daily talk show for daytime television. A presentation tape and a "mini-pilot" were produced and shopped to various networks and syndicators.

Filmography

Film

Television

References

External links
Former NFL safety Bo Eason enjoys second career as actor, playwright

1961 births
American football cornerbacks
Houston Oilers players
Living people
UC Davis Aggies football players
People from Walnut Grove, California